Mukurthi National Park (MNP) is a  protected area located in the western corner of the Nilgiris Plateau west of Ootacamund hill station in the northwest corner of Tamil Nadu state in the Western Ghats mountain range of South India. The park was created to protect its keystone species, the Nilgiri tahr.

The park is characterised by montane grasslands and shrublands interspersed with sholas in a high altitude area of high rainfall, near-freezing temperatures and high winds. It is home to an array of endangered wildlife, including royal Bengal tiger and Asian elephant, but its main mammal attraction is the Nilgiri tahr. The park was previously known as Nilgiri Tahr National Park.

The park is a part of Nilgiri Biosphere Reserve, India's first International Biosphere Reserve. As part of the Western Ghats, it is a UNESCO World Heritage Site since 1 July 2012.

History

Native hill tribe communities including the Toda people have harvested firewood from the sholas and grazed their animals including the hill buffalo for centuries. Indiscriminate felling of the sholas started with the establishment of British settlements in Ootacamund, Coonoor and Wellington in the early 19th century. Beginning in 1841 authorities issued contracts to bidders to fell wood from specific sholas in a 'timber conservancy' program. In 1868 James Breeds, commissioner of the Hills, wrote: "...unless conservancy is taken in hand and organized under some efficient system under the control of an experienced officer, the destruction of the sholas is but a question of time."

Bangitappal (Cannabis tableland), at the southwest end of the park at the confluence of two streams at the head of the Sispara Pass, used to be a halting place on the old Sispara ghat road from Kozhikode to Ooty, constructed in 1832. This pass provided a short land route for postal runners from Ooty to the west coast in the 19th century and was used for smuggling of cannabis, tobacco and later salt. A forest rest house and a trekkers shed built there in 1930 are now used by park staff and visiting researchers.

Between 1840 and 1856 plantations of several non-native tree species were introduced to the area to satisfy the fuel-wood demand. These included four wattle species (black wattle, silver wattle, green wattle and blackwood), eucalyptus, cypress, Indian long leaf pine and thorny gorse. Eucalyptus became the preferred plantation tree.

Unlike the others, the wattles spread by root suckers to quickly cover large areas of native grasslands, including the Mukurthi Hills, and was declared a pest "useful for covering wastelands.". Some black wattle plantations were maintained for the leather industry, as their bark yielded tannin.

The entire area of MNP, was declared as a Reserve forest in 1886.

In 1920 it was suggested that 10–15 acre plots in the Kundah Hills including the present park area, "be planted up each year in places where sholas have almost or quite disappeared, the most suitable species probably being Acacia dealbata (silver wattle)", thus replacing highly diverse endemic and stable ecosystems with an exotic monoculture supporting little animal diversity.

The area was declared as a wildlife sanctuary on 3 August 1982 and upgraded to a National Park on 15 October 1990 in order to protect the Nilgiri tahr.

Geography

Mukurthi National Park has an elongated crescent shape facing to the west between 11°10' to 11°22' N and 76°26' to 76°34' E. It is bordered on the west by Nilambur South Forest Division, to the northwest by Gudalur Forest Division, to the northeast, east and southeast by Nilgiri South Forest Division and to the south by Mannarghat Forest Division. At its southwest tip the peaks of this park straddle the northeast corner of Silent Valley National Park of Kerala.

On the Nilgiri Plateau, the Kundah range of the Nilgiri hills is a ridge on the south-western side of Mukurthi National Park bordering Kerala. The Tamil Nadu/Kerala border here is 39 km long. The park generally slopes towards the east and south receiving water from the Billithadahalla, Pykara and Kundah rivers, and the Upper Bhavani and Mukurthi reservoirs which flow through the park. Also several perennial streams originate in the park, most of which drain into the Bhavani River.

With elevations greater than the general level of the plateau, the range possesses some peaks close to the height of Doddabetta, just east of Ooty.
Avalanche hill of this range has twin-peaks of the Kudikkadu and the Kolaribetta. Derbetta (or Bear Hill) and Kolibetta, south of the Ouchterlony valley, are a continuation of the Kundah range.

Pichalbetta, Nilgiri Peak and Mukurthi Peak are the important heights of this area. Though not the highest hills in the Nilgiris, these three hills stand out in relation to the generally uniform level of this area.

Important peaks in the southwest Sispara/Bangitipal part of the park are Sispara Anginda, Nadugani and Gulkal.

Fauna

Several threatened mammal species live here including Nilgiri tahr, Indian elephant, Bengal tiger, Nilgiri marten, Nilgiri langur and Bonhote's mouse. Mukurthi is near the northern end of the range of the Nilgiri tahr. A three-day census in March 2007 estimated 200 tahrs in the park including 60 young ones sighted. There are also leopard, bonnet macaque, sambar deer, barking deer, mouse deer, otter, jungle cat, small Indian civet, wild dog, jackal, black-naped hare, shrew, Malabar spiny dormouse and soft-furred rat.

Avifauna consists mostly of hill birds including the threatened laughingthrush, whistling thrush, woodcock, wood pigeon, black-and-orange flycatcher, Nilgiri flycatcher, grey headed flycatcher black bulbul, white-eye, Nilgiri pipit. The predatory black-winged kite, kestrel and black eagle may be seen in the grasslands.

The area is home to many species of point-endemics among reptiles such as the geckos dwarf gecko spp., Nilgiri salea (Salea horsfieldii) and the skink (Kaestlea bilineata) the snakes horseshoe pit viper, checkered keelback, rat snake, Oligodon venustus, bronze-headed vine snake and several shieldtails of which Perrotet's shieldtail is the most common. Like reptiles, almost all species of amphibians here are endemic only to this region, except the widespread common Indian toad (Duttaphrynus melanostictus); main species include Bufo microtympanum and many species of tree frogs including Raorchestes tinniens, Raorchestes signatus, Raorchestes ravii,  Raorchestes thodai,  Raorchestes primarrumpfi, Ghatixalus variabilis and the dancing frog Micrixalus phyllophilus and aquatic ones like Nyctibatrachus indraneili and Fejervarya nilagirica. 

Butterflies with Himalayan affinity like the blue admiral, Indian red admiral, Indian fritillary, Indian cabbage white and hedge blues are seen here. Some streams had been stocked with exotic rainbow trout in the past.

Flora
The area is home to numerous endemic plants particularly of the scapigerous annual Impatiens plants. Alchemilla indica and Hedyotis verticillaris are found only within or on the fringes of this park.

Rhododendrons, Rhododendron arboreum the national flower of Nepal or Rhododendron nilagiricum,
are seen throughout the grasslands and very large specimens are conspicuous around many sholas. Other common shola trees and shrubs among the 58 species found here include: Syzygium calophyllifolium, Daphniphyllum neilgherrense, Cinnamomum wightii, Vaccinium leschenaulti, Mahonia leschenaulti, Litsea sp., Lasianthus sp., Psychotria sp. and Michelia nilagirica.
 
The edges of most sholas are lined with the shrubs: Gaultheria fragrantissima, Rhodomyrtus tomentosa, Rubus sp., Bergeris tinctoria, Eurya nitida, Strobilanthes sp., and Helichrysum sp.

The orchids Eria abliflora, Oberonia santapaui, Aerides ringens, Aerides crispa and Coelogyne odoratissima
are found on the high west edge of the park. Among the grasslands are a plethora of Brachycorythis iantha, Satyrium nepalense, Habenaria cephalotes, Seidenfia densiflora, Spiranthes sinensis and Liparis atropurpurea.
The natural habitats of the park have been much disturbed by previously easy motor vehicle access through four entry points and extensive commercial planting and natural spreading of non-native eucalyptus and wattle (Acacia dealbata, Acacia mearnsii and other species). In addition there is one large, and several smaller hydro-electric impoundments in the area.

Only 20% of the park area has more than a 50% chance of being used by tahr. If old commercial forests are removed and restored to their original grassland habitat, usable tahr habitat would increase to 60%.

Management
Mukurthi National Park is managed by the Tamil Nadu Department of Forestry with the main objective to conserve the endangered shola-grassland ecosystem and its endemic flora and fauna. The department operates an effective year round anti-poaching program with gun- and radio-equipped foot patrols operating from anti-poaching camps at Bangitappal, Nadugani, Western Catchment and Mukurthi Fishing Hut. 

Prevention and control of destructive wildfire is achieved through creation of artificial firebreaks in the form of hand-dug fire lines along ridges and cleared trek paths. Local fire watchers are employed for early detection and control during the dangerous December to April fire season. Invasive imported plant species, especially wattle, Scotch broom and gorse are controlled and eliminated from the park through a phased, long-term program focused on restoration of the original biota.

Tourism is not a management objective, but the Forest Department does periodically conduct nature awareness and conservation programs for the public and some special interest groups through controlled visits to the Western Catchment and Avalanche areas of the park.
  
The Forest Department seeks to identify and acquire contiguous undisturbed crucial habitat areas for future inclusion in the park.

Visitor information

Casual tourism and commercial tour operation is not permitted. Tourist facilities are not available in the park. Special interest groups are sometimes permitted for supervised educational programs, trekking and camping. There are forest rest houses at Bangitapal, Avalanche, Pykara and some unfurnished trekking sheds.

A mostly downhill three-, four- or five-day trek through Mukurthi and Silent Valley National Parks starts by driving 75 km from Udhagamandalam (Ooty) in 4 hours and a 1 km walk to overnight at Bangitapal. Walk 24 km through Mukurthi Park in 9 hours to overnight at Walakkad or overnight half-way at the new trekkers bungalow at Sispara peak then continue 12 km steep downhill the next day to Walakkad. Walk 18 km in 7 hours to overnight at Poochipara. Walk 8 km in 3 hours to Sairandhiri in Silent Valley, then take a park van out or overnight at Sairandhri and trek 23 km to Mukkali village. A forest guide-cum-cook accompanies park visitors during all treks.
In some cases the guide may instruct visitors to bend down to drink straight from a stream like a deer and prohibit bathing in a stream so the silt at the bottom is not disturbed and because human body odour might affect the animals.

Beginning in November 2007, the Forest Department has organised trekking programmes inside forest areas of Mukurthi Park with the objective to familiarise the public with their conservation efforts. The places covered by treks are Mudimund, Mukurthi Peak, Western Catchment, Bangitapal, Moyar, Anaikatti, Morganbetta, Avalanchi, Kolleribetta, Sispara and Silent Valley. Trek distances vary between 8 km and 60 km. Each group comprises up to 20 members. Guides, instructors, cooks, porters, tents and food are provided by the department. Trekkers have to bring rucksacks and sleeping bags. Application for trekking permits can be made to the range officer.

The nearest airport is Coimbatore (140 km away). The nearest railway station is Udhagamandalam (45 km away). The best seasons are February to May and September to November.

See also

100+ Photographs of Mukurthi National Park on flickr.com

References

External links
 A Day in Nilgiri Biosphere Reserve - A Lifescape To Experience available on YouTube.

National parks in Tamil Nadu
Protected areas established in 2001
Hill stations in Tamil Nadu
South Western Ghats montane rain forests
Tourist attractions in Nilgiris district
2001 establishments in Tamil Nadu